Buenos Aires is one of the forty subbarrios of Santurce, San Juan, Puerto Rico.

Demographics
In 2000, Buenos Aires had a population of 1,303.

In 2010, Buenos Aires had a population of 1,145 and a population density of 8,500 persons per square mile.

Location
Buenos Aires is located on the south section of Santurce east of Marruecos and Interstate PR-22 (José de Diego Expressway) down below Interstate PR-1 (Luis Muñoz Rivera Expressway).

Description and sites
There's only one street in the area, Los Angeles Street.

Buenos Aires acts as the home base for the headquarters of the Department of Recreation and Sports (Departamento de Recreación y Deportes) next to the San Juan Municipal Park. This park also serves the communities of other sectors in Santurce with three institutions located south of the Sagrado Corazón Train Station:
 The YMCA of San Juan (Basketball Center / Sport Center / Pool Center)
 Fondos Unidos de Puerto Rico (United Way of Puerto Rico)
 Centro Encuestre de Puerto Rico (Equestrian Center of Puerto Rico)

See also 
 
 List of communities in Puerto Rico

References

Santurce, San Juan, Puerto Rico
Municipality of San Juan